Opostega brithys is a moth of the family Opostegidae. It was described by Turner in 1923. It is known from Queensland in Australia.

References

Opostegidae
Moths described in 1923